St. Louis v. Myers, 113 U.S. 566 (1885), was a motion to dismiss for want of a federal question to give jurisdiction regarding Acts that admitted Missouri into the Union while leaving the rights of riparian owners on the Mississippi River to be settled according to the principles of state law and relinquishing to the City of St. Louis the rights of the United States in wharves and thoroughfares, which did not authorize the city to impair the rights of other riparian proprietors by extending streets into the river.

Chief Justice Waite delivered the opinion of the Court.

The court was satisfied that no case has been made for its jurisdiction, and the motion to dismiss was granted.

See also
List of United States Supreme Court cases, volume 113

References

External links
 

United States Supreme Court cases
United States Supreme Court cases of the Waite Court
1880s in the environment
1885 in United States case law
History of St. Louis
United States federal question jurisdiction case law